William Herriman may refer to:
 William H. Herriman (1829–1918), American art collector
 William S. Herriman (1791–1867), businessman  and president of Long Island Bank